The Buehler test is an in vivo test to screen for substances that cause human skin sensitisation (i.e. allergens).  It was first proposed by Edwin Vernon Buehler in 1965 and further explained in 1980.

It is a non-adjuvant test. In the test, guinea pigs are exposed to a high dose of the substance.  They are then given a challenge dose, which is the highest dose that does not cause irritation.

The test has been largely superseded by the murine local lymph node assay.

References

Allergology